Deseos (meaning desires or wishes) is the 2005 debut solo album of the Sahrawi singer Mariem Hassan. The album was recorded at Axis estudios in Madrid, and produced by guitarist Baba Salama, who died of leukemia one week before the release of the album. With the use of two electric guitars (played by Baba Salama and Boika Hassan, Mariem's brother) and two  (played by Fatta Sadaf and Leila), the album had been hailed as a fresh actualization of the traditional Sahrawi Haul traditional music. The song "La Tumchu anni" is one of the highlights, a picturesque desert blues. It also contains one of Mariem's most known songs, "La Intifada", about the 2005 Sahrawi Independence Intifada. "El Chouhada" is dedicated to her three dead brothers, who were killed fighting during the Western Sahara War, while in "Mutamaniyat" she asks God for the healing of her breast cancer.

Track listing

References 

2005 albums
Mariem Hassan albums
Arabic-language albums
Spanish-language albums